was a Japanese businessman and the son of Toyoda Loom Works founder Sakichi Toyoda. His decision to change Toyoda's focus from automatic loom manufacture into automobile manufacturing created what would become Toyota Motor Corporation.

Toyoda Loom Works and Toyota Motor Corporation
Kiichiro Toyoda persuaded his father, who was responsible as head of the family business, to invest in the expansion of Toyoda Loom Works into a concept automobiles division; of which was considered a risk to the family business at the time. Shortly before Sakichi Toyoda died, he encouraged his son to follow his dream and pursue automobile manufacturing — Kiichiro would solidify the mechanical prowess the family had experienced inventing steam, oil, and electric looms, and would develop and institute what eventually became the global powerhouse of modern fame today, Toyota Motor Corporation. He would also institute the spelling of the automobile company away from the family name to famously garner good luck.

Toyoda would never know the success that would come to him as he resigned from the company he developed in 1950 in reaction to flagging sales and profitability. He died two years later; his contemporaries would call him "Japan's Thomas Edison". In 1957, his cousin and confidant Eiji Toyoda, would follow him as head of Toyota Motor Corporation, and build the late Toyoda's successful expansion into a world-class conglomeration of engineering and the launch of Japan's most prominent luxury brand, Lexus.

Early life

Childhood 
Toyoda was born on June 11, 1894, in Yamaguchi in the village of Yoshitsu in Shizuoka Prefecture, Japan (currently Yamaguchi, Kosai, Shizuoka), the eldest son of Sakichi Toyoda and Tami Sahara.

Before Kiichiro was born, Sakichi stayed in Toyohashi. At the time, Sakichi came to Yoshitsumachi to give a name to Kiichiro. However, after Sakichi named Kiichiro, he soon returned to Toyohashi. Also, less than two months after his mother, Tami, gave birth to him, she left him and her husband. She did so because she was sick of her husband, who, in her eyes, was too preoccupied with industrial inventions to pay any attention to their family life. Therefore, Kiichiro was raised in Yoshitsu village by his grandparents. At the age of three, Kiichiro moved to what is now Higashi-ku, Nagoya, Aichi Prefecture, where Sakichi lived. In terms of education, Kiichiro entered Kyodo Kanji Ordinary Elementary School and then changed to Takadake Ordinary Elementary School (currently Nagoya Municipal Higashisakura Elementary School). After that, he entered Aichi Normal School Elementary School (currently Aichi University of Education Nagoya Elementary School), Meirin Junior High School (currently Aichi Prefectural Meiwa High School), and Second High School. In 1920, he graduated from the Department of Mechanical Engineering, Faculty of Engineering, at Tokyo Imperial University. After graduation, he remained in Tokyo Imperial University at the Faculty of Law for about seven months until March 1921. Kiichiro excelled at his studies.

After graduating university 
After graduating, Toyoda returned to his hometown, Nagoya, and joined Toyota Boshoku, which was founded by his father, Sakichi, in 1918 (Sakichi served as company president since then). From July 1921 to February 1922, Kiichirō visited San Francisco, London, Oldham (a large town in Greater Manchester, England), etc. to learn about the spinning and weaving industry and then returned from Marseille via Shanghai. After he returned to Japan, in December 1922, he married Hatako Iida, the daughter of the Takashimaya department store chain co-founder, Shinshichi Iida. In 1926, Kiichiro established Toyota Industries Corporation and became its managing director. Also, he became interested in automatic looms, so he set up a pilot plant in Kariya, Aichi to start development for them even though his father, Sakichi, disagreed. He traveled to Europe and America from September 1929 to April 1930, and thought that the automobile industry, which was in its infancy at that time, would greatly develop in the future. Therefore, in 1933, an automobile manufacturing department (later the automobile department) was newly established in Toyota Industries Corporation. In 1936, it was designated as a licensed company under the Automotive Manufacturing Act. In 1937, it became independent as Toyota Motor Corporation. Kiichirō became the vice president the same year (the president was Rizaburo Toyoda). In 1941, Kiichiro took office as president. At the height of the Pacific theater of World War II, the Toyoda family would be affected on both family business and home fronts. His children's education would be delayed by civil ramifications, and his business would be compelled to manufacture trucks for the Imperial Japanese Army. The family firms would be spared destruction in the days before the Japanese government's surrender.

Expanding to automotive industry 
He is a key figure in paving the way for the Japanese automobile industry, and without him, today's Japanese automobile industry might have been less developed. The automobile industry plays a very important role in supporting the Japanese economy. The number of automobiles produced in Japan dramatically increased from 70,000 to 11.4 million between 1955 and 1980, and in 1980 exceeded the number of automobiles produced by the United States. In addition, the ratio of overseas exports of Japanese automobiles was 55% in 1985.

Kiichiro is said to have opened the path for the Japanese automobile industry, and he is credited for creating from scratch domestic cars that were superior to foreign cars. The differences between Japan and the United States in the automobile industry during World War II were quite large. In the early 1930s, Kiichiro proceeded with the development toward the domestic production of automobiles. In 1933, Toyota Industries Corporation set up an automobile department and began full-scale development of automobiles. However, the development of the car did not proceed smoothly. For instance, no one had experience in automobile manufacturing, so he gathered those who had experience in automobile manufacturing from across Japan. Also, it took six months to manufacture the engine. Then, in May 1935, the first A1 passenger car was finally completed. After that, it produced AA passenger cars that improved the A1 type and GA trucks that improved the G1 type. Moreover, Toyota Industries Corporation was designated with the Nissan Motor Company in September as a licensed company under the Automotive Manufacturing Act. However, Kiichiro was worried that being selected as the licensed company would lead to the loss of the competitiveness of the automobile industry and it would cause the destruction of the Japanese automobile industry. In 1937, Toyota Motor Corporation was established and Kiichiro was elected as vice president. Kiichiro's management was very good for mainly two reasons. First, He controlled and made the operation simpler to produce more cars on a shoestring. Specifically, to clarify the internal organization, the company was divided into seven divisions, and the purpose and jurisdiction of each division were clearly decided. Second, he reduced the risk of mass-produced cars by being involved not only in mass-produced cars but also in the manufacture of specialty cars. In November 1938, the Koromo Factory was established, and it worked hard to manufacture automobiles. However, the problems of automobile quality and cost arose, and the management was put into a critical situation. To overcome this situation, Kiichiro solved those problems by taking prompt action and in-house manufacturing of automobile parts. In 1941, Kiichiro became president of Toyota Motor Industry.

Toyota Motor Corporation and war

Wartime

During Sino-Japanese War 
Toyota Motor Corporation had restricted its activities due to the war. In 1937, the second Sino-Japanese War broke out and it caused great challenges to the Japanese automobile industry including Toyota Motor Corporation. Following the end of the war, the Japanese government restricted automobile production in favor of products for the military, making the production and purchase of passenger cars difficult. In 1938, the National General Mobilization Law was enacted to maximize the use of human and physical resources. This law required Toyota Motor Corporation to provide trucks to the military and munitions industries with priority. In addition, the production of passenger cars was restricted and small passenger car production ceased to increase the production of military trucks.

Starting in 1939, automobile industries had to obtain permission from the Minister of Commerce and Industry to sell passenger cars. Even after that, control was further strengthened. In 1940, Toyota Motor Corporation and Nissan were reinforced control for selling large trucks and buses by the Japanese government, so the control made customers buy these trucks and buses personally. Those who wished to purchase were approved by a long procedure. To be specific, they applied for purchase at a dealer with permission of local police officers, next, obtained a survey from the dealer, and then, applying for a vehicle dispatch to the manufacturer was required. However, the possibility of accepting general orders has become extremely low.

During World War II 
This situation became worse after the entry into World War II. Toyota Motor Corporation was designated as a munitions company in 1944, and strict control continued. Kiichiro must have had very unsatisfactory days during this period about not being permitted to make passenger cars. However, even during this time, Kiichiro concentrated on thinking about technical problems. He believed that the automobile business would definitely serve post-war Japan and continued to explore the technical issues despite such difficult times.

Postwar

Under occupation and Kiichiro's actions 
Japan accepted the Potsdam Declaration on August 14, 1945, which brought the war to an end on the following day, 15th in Japan. Postwar Japan was occupied by GHQ (General Headquarters). In terms of the automobile industry, GHQ did not allow a Japanese automobile company to make passenger cars except for trucks. Like this, Kiichiro still faced difficult problems. However, he did not lose in this hard situation. He took a leading place and took many actions for the restoration of the Japanese automotive industry. First, in November 1945, he established an umbrella organization for the automotive industry (自動車統括団体) initiatively and he became the chairman of the organization. In the following year, he negotiated with GHQ by himself, and made GHQ admit that the new organization was different from the one of the wartime. Kiichiro also invited representatives of distribution companies nationwide to Koromo. He gave speeches about policy changes at Toyota Motor Corporation and proceeded with talks for the recovery of the automobile industry. His forceful speeches impressed the representatives. These actions show how much he was passionate about the car and the automobile industry and justified him acting on the behalf of the automobile industry. In addition, after the war, many dealers of each company were released from control and became independent. Some of these dealers' companies restarted as Toyota dealerships and were able to back to the prewar company. This shows how much he was trusted as the president of Toyota Motor Corporation by the owners of the dealerships. In fact, Kiichiro valued relationship with dealerships, so he usually communicated with people directly and dealt with problems as soon as possible if they suggested.

Hard situation 
However, producing and selling cars was still difficult. Raw materials and parts were not immediately available in the poor period after the war, and it was harder to obtain cheap and high-quality genuine parts than before. The production of trucks did not reach the monthly production goal of 500 cars. In 1945, the annual production volume was 3275 units, and in the following year, 5821units. Although the production of passenger cars was prohibited, research for passenger cars was allowed by the GHQ. Also, as a part of the occupation policy, the automobile company was contracted to repair United States military vehicles in Japan, which was a good opportunity for Toyota employees, including Kiichiro, to learn more about the structure of American cars. They analized and absorbed the advanced parts of American cars, and then used them as a reference for the development of their own passenger car. Kiichiro kept working hard to develop the Japanese automobile industry, even under the adverse circumstances of the postwar period.

Passenger car production resumes 
Kiichiro continued to put a great deal of effort into passenger cars in terms of research, manufacturing and selling. In June 1947, GHQ approved the production of up to 300 passenger cars under 1500 cc per year, so he started to work on passenger car production from this day officially. In October 1947, the first Japanese passenger car after the war, the SA model with an S engine, was released and was nicknamed "Toyopet." However, there were mainly two problems during this period. First, these passenger cars did not sell at all. This car was highly evaluated in the automobile industry at the time, but during that time, there were not many customs for the common people to buy a car for a drive. Therefore, the passenger car was sold only 197 units during the five years since it released, even though 12,7996 trucks were sold over the same period. Second problem was that the production facilities were not good. There were many machines that had been used for many years and were not well maintained, so Kiichiro was worried about whether the cars of Toyota Motor Corporation could beat foreign cars. Moreover, if Toyota Motor Company couldn't complete a car that would be better and cheaper than a foreign car in a few years and that Japanese people would be willing to buy, Kiichiro was thinking about working with a foreign car manufacturer. From the description, it is clear that Kiichiro aimed to make passenger cars for Japanese with cheap and high quality, and make Japanese happy.

Dodge Line recession

Causes and influences 
The automobile industry was hit hard by the recession caused by the 1949 Dodge Line. Toyota Motor Corporation slowed the collection of sales proceeds due to the effects of inflation control and the setting of a single exchange rate. The reason why the inflation broke out in Japan was that the Japanese government spent a great deal of money to support soldiers returning to Japan and withdrawals from overseas and then, increased currency. From the background, GHQ decided to set a single exchange rate of 360 yen per dollar to stabilize the Japanese economy. Due to the influence of recession, demand for automobiles declined furthermore. In addition, the price of materials for cars was risen, and cash management was deteriorated considerably. This was how the management of the company was deteriorated significantly. In response to this, Kiichiro went out to sell together with the executives and went to collect accounts receivable. Furthermore, he made his best effort to save money for materials, but there was a limit, and in the end, there was a deficit of 22 million yen every month. Due to Dodge Line recession, over 8000 companies went bankrupt during the year of 1949.

Avoiding dismissal of employees 
In August 1949, the company finally proposed to cut 10% of wages and cut retirement pay in half. As a result, the company promised not to dismiss employees, instead of accepting a 10% wage reduction. Under this circumstance, the other car companies laid down their workforce. For example, at Nihon Denso (currently Denso), which was established in December 1949, a labor dispute arose over personnel rearrangement. On March 31, 1950, four months after its establishment, Nihon Denso announced a company restructuring plan that included personnel reduction of 473 people. Under such situation, the reason why Kiichiro did not perform personnel reduction was that he experienced the employment problem at Toyota Industries Corporation during the Showa Depression in 1930, so decided that such a situation would never occur again.  Moreover, the advance into the automobile business was also a measure to prevent the recurrence of employment problems due to business diversification. Therefore, He absolutely tried to avoid personnel reduction. Kiichiro visited the banks in the city every day to get finance account. After all, no financial institution provided the funds for company. However, Shotaro Kamiya, who was a managing director of sales, persistently requested the financing provision from Sogo Takanashi who was a branch manager of the Bank of Japan, Nagoya Branch. After that, finally, the syndicate consisting of 24 banks was established through the placement of the Bank of Japan. Toyota Motor Company could get 188.2 million yen in loans, subject to Toyota's reconstruction plan formulation. In this way, Kiichiro overcame the bankruptcy crisis of 1949.

Labor dispute 
Despite the strong promotion of management rationalization measures, the company's business performance never recovered. The reason is, on October 25, 1949, GHQ issued a "Memorandum on the total removal of restrictions on the production and sale of automobiles". As a result, the production and sale of automobiles became free in principle, but about the supply of production materials, the allocation and distribution system by the Ministry of International Trade and Industry remained, and the prices of materials and automobiles remained regulated. Moreover, while the controlled prices of materials were gradually raised thereafter, while the controlled prices of automobiles remained unchanged until April 1950, the profitability of the automobile business remained extremely difficult. Not only Toyota Motor Corporation but also Nissan Motor Corporation and Isuzu Motors Corporation deteriorated in business performance. For the four and a half months from November 16, 1949, to March 31, 1950, the loss was 76.52 million yen, so Toyota Labor Union judged that the personnel cut was inevitable, and a quasi-fighting system was established in March of the same year. Since then, labor-management negotiations have intensified into long-standing disputes. Under such tension, Kiichiro, who was originally hypertensive, became ill, so negotiations with the labor union were handled by the management army instead of Kiichiro. However, On April 22, 1950, the company announced that it would carry out 1,600 voluntary retirements to the labor union. On the other hand, since the company had promised not to lay off its personnel, the union naturally became furious and continued with extreme strikes. The strikes continued daily for about two months after the declaration, which caused production in April and May to drop 70% from its previous average. Since the company would be destroyed as it is, on June 5, 1950, Kiichiro announced that he would resign as the president to take on this series of responsibilities. By his retirement, the strike ended finally. Everyone was shocked by Kiichiro's resignation, and the union also had a respect for Kiichiro.

Retirement and death 
After retiring from the role of president, he created a laboratory at his home in Okamoto, Setagaya, Tokyo, and worked every day to design a small helicopter. On March 27, 1952, Toyoda died after suffering a fall resulting from a cerebral hemorrhage caused by chronic disease. He was 57 years old.

Family tree

References

External links 
 

1894 births
1952 deaths
Japanese automotive pioneers
Kiichiro
Toyota people
University of Tokyo alumni
People from Aichi Prefecture
Japanese Buddhists
Japanese founders of automobile manufacturers
20th-century Japanese businesspeople